Irma Inashvili (born 6 July 1970) is a Georgian politician and journalist. She has been a member of the Parliament of Georgia since November 2016, representing the Alliance of Patriots of Georgia. She is the current deputy chairperson of the Parliament of Georgia. She has also been the general secretary of the Alliance of Patriots of Georgia since 2014.

Inashvili attended high school in Borjomi before studying journalism at Tbilisi State University. She was a director of 1TV from 1993 to 2005, and was a correspondent on the ground during the Abkhaz–Georgian conflict. In 2005, she co-founded the Objective Media Union, an opposition media outlet. OMU both recorded television programs and published newspapers; it was blocked from holding a broadcasting license and forced to distribute programs online from 2006 to 2009, but later regained its broadcast license. Inashvili served as both editor (2010-2015) and program director (2010-2014) of the organisation.

Inashvili became involved in the Resistance Movement against President Mikhail Saakashvili in 2010, and was involved in breaking stories about the abuse of prisoners under the Saakashvili government. She later left the Objective Media Union to enter politics, co-founding the Alliance of Patriots of Georgia and from 2014 serving as its general secretary. She was elected to the Parliament of Georgia at the 2016 parliamentary election, and serves as deputy chairperson of parliament and a member of the Human Rights And Civil Integration Committee and State Constitutional Commission.

References

1970 births
Living people
Members of the Parliament of Georgia
Journalists from Georgia (country)
20th-century women politicians from Georgia (country)
20th-century politicians from Georgia (country)
20th-century women writers from Georgia (country)